The arrondissement of Châteauroux is a district (arrondissement) of France in the Indre department in the administrative region of Centre-Val de Loire. It has 84 communes.

Composition

The communes of the arrondissement of Châteauroux, and their INSEE codes, are:
 
 Ardentes (36005)
 Argenton-sur-Creuse (36006)
 Argy (36007)
 Arpheuilles (36008)
 Arthon (36009)
 Badecon-le-Pin (36158)
 Baraize (36012)
 Baudres (36013)
 Bazaiges (36014)
 Bouesse (36022)
 Bouges-le-Château (36023)
 Bretagne (36024)
 Brion (36026)
 Buzançais (36031)
 Ceaulmont (36032)
 Celon (36033)
 La Chapelle-Orthemale (36040)
 Chasseneuil (36042)
 Châteauroux (36044)
 Châtillon-sur-Indre (36045)
 Chavin (36048)
 Chezelles (36050)
 Cléré-du-Bois (36054)
 Clion (36055)
 Coings (36057)
 Cuzion (36062)
 Déols (36063)
 Diors (36064)
 Écueillé (36069)
 Éguzon-Chantôme (36070)
 Étrechet (36071)
 Fléré-la-Rivière (36074)
 Fontguenand (36077)
 Francillon (36079)
 Frédille (36080)
 Gargilesse-Dampierre (36081)
 Gehée (36082)
 Heugnes (36086)
 Jeu-les-Bois (36089)
 Jeu-Maloches (36090)
 Langé (36092)
 Levroux (36093)
 Luant (36101)
 Luçay-le-Mâle (36103)
 Lye (36107)
 Mâron (36112)
 Le Menoux (36117)
 Méobecq (36118)
 Montierchaume (36128)
 Mosnay (36131)
 Moulins-sur-Céphons (36135)
 Murs (36136)
 Neuillay-les-Bois (36139)
 Niherne (36142)
 Palluau-sur-Indre (36149)
 Le Pêchereau (36154)
 Pellevoisin (36155)
 Le Poinçonnet (36159)
 Pommiers (36160)
 Le Pont-Chrétien-Chabenet (36161)
 Préaux (36166)
 Rouvres-les-Bois (36175)
 Saint-Cyran-du-Jambot (36188)
 Saint-Genou (36194)
 Saint-Lactencin (36198)
 Saint-Marcel (36200)
 Saint-Maur (36202)
 Saint-Médard (36203)
 Sassierges-Saint-Germain (36211)
 Selles-sur-Nahon (36216)
 Sougé (36218)
 Tendu (36219)
 Le Tranger (36225)
 Valençay (36228)
 Velles (36231)
 Vendœuvres (36232)
 La Vernelle (36233)
 Veuil (36235)
 Vicq-sur-Nahon (36237)
 Villedieu-sur-Indre (36241)
 Villegongis (36242)
 Villegouin (36243)
 Villentrois-Faverolles-en-Berry (36244)
 Vineuil (36247)

History

The arrondissement of Châteauroux was created in 1800. At the January 2017 reorganisation of the arrondissements of Indre, it gained eight communes from the arrondissement of La Châtre, and it lost one commune to the arrondissement of Le Blanc and one commune to the arrondissement of La Châtre.

As a result of the reorganisation of the cantons of France which came into effect in 2015, the borders of the cantons are no longer related to the borders of the arrondissements. The cantons of the arrondissement of Châteauroux were, as of January 2015:

 Ardentes
 Argenton-sur-Creuse
 Buzançais
 Châteauroux-Centre
 Châteauroux-Est
 Châteauroux-Ouest
 Châteauroux-Sud
 Châtillon-sur-Indre
 Écueillé
 Levroux
 Valençay

References

Chateauroux